Visha Oosi Case (lit. meaning case of toxic injection) is a series of murders that took place between 1970 and 1972. The Victims were mostly people carrying higher amount of cash and jewellery were targeted and murdered. This case rocked the city of Chennai, India during 1970's.

References

Crime in Tamil Nadu
Indian serial killers
Male serial killers